Louise Marguerite Espérance Langlois (19 October 1805 – 4 December 1864) was a French painter and printmaker.
From her marriage to the lawyer and businessman Jean-Adrien Bourlet de la Vallée she was also known as Espérance Bourlet de la Vallée.

Life

Espérance Langlois was born on 19 October 1805 at Pont-de-l'Arche in Normandy.
Her grandfather had been an adviser to the king of France.
Her father was the artist and antiquarian Eustache-Hyacinthe Langlois.
Throughout her childhood the family lived in great poverty, first in Pont-de-l'Arche and after 1816 in Rouen, while her father struggled to live by selling his work.
These included drawings of old architecture and gothic-style illustrations of legends.
Both Espérance and her brother Polyclès Langlois were taught by their father and often assisted him with drawings and engravings.

Espérance Langlois married Jean-Adrien Bourlet de la Vallée. 
Their son Alexandre  Bourlet de la Vallée was a classmate of Gustave Flaubert.
In 1834 the Rouen Academy of Fine Arts awarded her a silver medal in the category "Genre works".
Espérance was later employed for several years as a painter by the Sèvres porcelain factory.
The porcelain work she made there was shown at many exhibitions of industrial art in France and England.
She died on 4 December 1864 at Sèvres.

Work

Espérance Langlois published seven engraved plates in an 1832 book written by her father about ancient and modern paintings on glass.
A book reviewer said of these engravings, "The beautiful and curious windows of the churches of St. Godard, the Cathedral, St. Ouen, St. Patrice, and St. Vincent in Rouen have been copied by Madamoiselle Langlois with great spirit, skill and faithfulness."
Another praised the beauty and exactitude of the drawings.
Three plates drawn and engraved by Esperance appeared in an 1833 Histoire du Privilege de Saint-Romain.

Her illustrations in her father's book Stalles de la cathédrale de Rouen, published in 1838, are the main source for the appearance of the choir stalls and misericords that were destroyed when Rouen Cathedral was bombed during World War II.
Some of her engravings appeared in another book by her father on the dance of the dead, published in 1852.
Other works that have been attributed to her include engravings of historical, archaeological and religious topics and oil paintings of scenery and portraits.

Selected works

 Vue intérieure du cloître de Saint-Wandrille. Drawing
 Le Partage ou Enfants sur les quais de Paris. Oil on canvas, 46 × 55 cm (also attributed to Eugène Langlois).
 Procession en Normandie. Oil on canvas, 21 × 27 cm.
 Portrait de dame. Oil on canvas, 33 × 41 cm (attributed).
 Vitrail de Saint Julien de la cathédrale de Rouen. Engraving (1832).
 Cérémonie de la levée de la Fierté. Engraving (1833).
 Mausolée du cardinal d'Amboise, dans la cathédrale de Rouen. Engraving with gouache highlights
 1836 Tete de vieille femme de Normandie
 1836 Portrait de M.B. de la V., advocate at the royal court of Rouen
 1839 Faust et Marguerite 
 1853 Portrait de Rembrandt; porcelain

References

Sources

1805 births
1864 deaths
19th-century French painters
French engravers
French illustrators
French printmakers